Blair Maesmore Campbell (20 August 1946 – 3 November 2020) was an Australian rules footballer and cricketer.

Campbell played first-class cricket for Victoria and Tasmania as a slow left-arm wrist-spin bowler and right-handed batsman. He also played in Victorian Football League for both Richmond and Melbourne Football Clubs during the 1960s.

Campbell is considered one of the earliest exponents of the banana kick.

References

External links

1946 births
2020 deaths
Australian cricketers
Tasmania cricketers
Richmond Football Club players
Melbourne Football Club players
Australian rules footballers from Melbourne
Cricketers from Melbourne
Victoria cricketers